George Paton was a Scottish football player during the 1940s and 1950s.  He started his career with junior side Yoker Athletic before signing professionally with Hearts.  He shortly thereafter transferred to Dumbarton where he played with distinction, being a constant in the goalkeeping position for over five seasons.

References 

Scottish footballers
Dumbarton F.C. players
Heart of Midlothian F.C. players
Scottish Football League players
Possibly living people
Association football goalkeepers
Year of birth missing